Tornion Pallo −47 (or TP-47) is a Finnish football club, based in the town of Tornio. It currently plays in the Finnish Third Division (Kolmonen). It plays its home matches at Pohjan Stadion. The most famous player who has been raised by the club is Teemu Tainio.

Season to season

2 seasons in Veikkausliiga
14 seasons in Ykkönen
26 seasons in Kakkonen
18 seasons in Kolmonen
1 seasons in Nelonen
1 seasons in Vitonen

Notable players
 Keijo Huusko, National player for Finland

References

External links
Official website

 
Football clubs in Finland
Tornio
1947 establishments in Finland
Association football clubs established in 1947